Krishnamurti Villanueva (born May 23, 1971) is a Filipino actor in movies and television. He was a former matinee idol in the late 1980s. He was a cast member of That's Entertainment, a youth-oriented talent and variety show now defunct in the Philippines.

Career
Villanueva started as commercial model of Coca-Cola until discovered by Deo Fajardo. He became a member of That's Entertainment. He received a nomination from FAMAS Awards (Filipino Academy of Movie Arts and Sciences), Luna Awards (Film Academy of the Philippines), Star Awards for Movies (Philippine Movie Press Club) and Gawad Urian Award for Best Supporting Actor in Miguel/Michelle (1998). He starred as Filmmaker 2 in Bayaning 3rd World (1999), in which Villanueva was nominated for Gawad Urian Best Actor.

He played as the father of Jillian Ward in Mars Ravelo's TV series Trudis Liit showed in GMA Network. In 2011, Cris Villanueva made a comeback in ABS-CBN as Rocco Amarillo in Mula sa Puso - Rocco Amarillo is the biological father of Gabriel (JM De Guzman) who saved the life of Magda (Dawn Zulueta) under the direction of Wenn V. Deramas. He was included in the powerhouse cast of Kahit Puso'y Masugatan, TV series aired in ABS-CBN starring Iza Calzado, Gabby Concepcion, Andi Eigenmann and Jake Cuenca.

Personal Life

Cris was married with 4 kids from previous relationships, Gian Villanueva former wife, Nancy Sunga; Rafaiel de Guzman from girlfriend, sexy starlet, Criselda Volks, and Zarina Krishna Villanueva & Zachary Khalil Villanueva from the former fashion model, Czar Carbonell.

His Father Hector Died at the age of 74 at November 24, 2016

Filmography

Television

Film

References

External links

1971 births
Living people
ABS-CBN personalities
Filipino male comedians
Filipino male film actors
Filipino male television actors
Filipino people of Spanish descent
GMA Network personalities
That's Entertainment (Philippine TV series)
That's Entertainment Friday Group Members